Yu-Chien (Benny) Tseng (born August 24, 1994) is a Taiwanese violinist. In 2012 he was fifth laureate in the Queen Elisabeth Music Competition, where he also won both the Musiq'3 and the Klara-Canvas prizes awarded by the public. In the 15th International Tchaikovsky Competition held in 2015, Tseng won the 2nd prize in the violin contest, in which no first prize was awarded. Tseng has recorded for Fuga Libera and the Chimei Museum.

Life and career
Yu-Chien Tseng was born in Taipei County (now New Taipei City). In pre-school, Tseng's parents worried that he was tone deaf. His father enrolled him in percussion classes after hearing tests showed Tseng's hearing to be normal. He started to study the violin at the age of 5. By the age of 6, he had already performed with the Taipei Symphony Orchestra. In his native Taiwan, he studied with Po-Shan Lin, Ying-Liang Shen, I-Ching Li and C. Nanette Chen. Since 2008 he has studied at the Curtis Institute of Music, under professors Ida Kavafian and Aaron Rosand. In 2009 he won the 10th Pablo Sarasate International Competition in Pamplona (Spain). In 2011 he won the Isang Yun Competition in Tongyeong (South Korea) and also was awarded a special prize at the XIV International Tchaikovsky Competition (as best of those in Round II who did not make the finals). In 2012 he took fifth place in the Queen Elisabeth Competition in Brussels. He has performed with the Philadelphia Orchestra, the National Orchestra of Belgium, and the symphony orchestras of Singapore, Taipei, and Navarra among others. He has given solo concerts in cities in the US, Europe and Asia.

In 2017, Tseng was featured in the opening ceremony of the 2017 Summer Universiade in Taipei, Taiwan with a solo violin performance.

Awards
 2006: Third Prize in Yehudi Menuhin International Competition for Young Violinists Junior division
 2009: First Prize and Prize to Best Interpreter of Works by Sarasate in 10th Pablo Sarasate International Competition in Pamplona (Spain)
 2010: Associazione Amici di Paganini Prize and Prize in memory of Dr. Enrico Costa in the 53rd Paganini Competition
 2011: Jury Discretionary Award in The XIV International Tchaikovsky Competition
 2011: First Prize and Isang Yun Special Prize in Isang Yun Competition in Tongyeong (South Korea)
 2012: Fifth Prize in Queen Elisabeth Competition
 2015: First Prize in Singapore International Violin Competition
 2015: Second Prize in the XV International Tchaikovsky Competition (no first prize awarded)

Recordings
His debut disc featuring music by French composers was released by Fuga Libera.
 Franck, Ravel, Debussy - French Violin Sonatas with Inga Dzektser, piano (Fuga Libera: FUG597)
 Sarasate Violin Pieces (Chimei Museum: S000887011011088)
 Reverie: Chopin, Ernst, Mozart, Tartini, Tchaikovsky, Wieniawski with Rohan De Silva, piano (Universal Music Taiwan / Deutsche Grammophon: UCCG-1774)

References

VC ‘Young Artist’ Yu-Chien Benny Tseng Awarded Top Prize at Tchaikovsky Violin Comp | The Violin Channel
Yu-Chien Tseng: Sibelius and Tchaikovsky Concertos | Violin: Final Round | The XV International Tchaikovsky Competition
Tchaikovsky Competition 2015: violinist Yu-Chien Tseng performs Valse-Scherzo | The Strad 
VC YOUNG ARTIST | Yu-Chien Benny Tseng, 20 – Sarasate, Isang Yun & Singapore Competition 1st Prizes | The Violin Channel
Tseng, Yu-Chien | CLASSICTIC.COM
Teenage violinist performs with National Symphony Orchestra | Culture.tw
Curtis Musicians Perform at the Mann Center June 29-July 1 | The Curtis Institute of Music

External links

 Performance Tchaikovsky Violin Concerto | 3rd Mvt

1994 births
Living people
Musicians from New Taipei
Taiwanese violinists
Taiwanese classical musicians
Curtis Institute of Music alumni
Prize-winners of the International Tchaikovsky Competition
Prize-winners of the Queen Elisabeth Competition
Paganini Competition prize-winners
21st-century classical violinists